Ghost is a Swedish record producing and songwriting team, composed of Ulf Lindström and Johan Ekhé, based in New York City. They are perhaps best known for writing and producing Swedish singer Robyn's three first studio albums, Robyn Is Here (1996), My Truth (1999), and Don't Stop the Music (2002). Robyn's "Keep This Fire Burning" from 2003 was the fourth most played song by Swedish songwriters on Swedish radio from 2000 to 2009. It was later covered by British soul singer Beverley Knight.

In 2005, Darin released "Money for Nothing", written by Ghost, Robyn and Danish songwriter Remee, which won a Swedish Grammis award for "Song of the Year". Additional credits included Sadie, Orup, Ana Johnsson, No Angels, Laura Pausini, and Thomas Helmig. Ghost co-produced Darin's two albums The Anthem and the self-titled Darin. Co-producers included RedOne, Jörgen Elofsson, Arnthor Birgisson, Johan Brorson and George Samuelson for the first album and RedOne, Samuelson and Elofsson for the second.

References

External links
 

Record production duos
Songwriting teams